George Moffat (1848 – September 17, 1918) was a New Brunswick businessman and political figure. He represented Restigouche in the House of Commons of Canada as a Conservative member from 1887 to 1891.

He was born in Campbellton, New Brunswick in 1848, the son of George Moffat, and was educated there. Moffat became a merchant in Dalhousie. In 1881, he married a Miss Wilkinson. He was elected to the House of Commons by acclamation in an 1887 by-election following the death of his brother Robert.

References 

1848 births
1918 deaths
Conservative Party of Canada (1867–1942) MPs
Members of the House of Commons of Canada from New Brunswick
People from Campbellton, New Brunswick
Canadian people of Scottish descent